Hinduism is the largest religious tradition in the Indian state of West Bengal with approximately 70.5% of the population identifying themselves as Hindus (as of 2011). The Hindus in West Bengal mostly belong to the Shakta (the Kalikula tradition), minority to Vaishnavite and a small community belong to Shaivite and other denominations. The vast majority of Hindus in West Bengal are Bengali Hindus numbering around 55 million and comprising 60.2% of the state population of 91.35 million (2011) but a notable section of non-Bengali Hindus also exist, particularly among Marwaris, Biharis, Odias, Gurkhas,  Sindhis, Gujaratis and various tribal communities such as Koch, Santals, Munda and particularly Adivadis numbering around 9.4 million comprising rest 10.3% of the state population.

Hinduism had existed in the region of Bengal before the 16th century BC and by the 3rd century, Buddhism and Jainism were popular too. Gaur, the first sovereign Hindu kingdom in Bengal with its capital in Karnasubarna in modern-day Murshidabad district, was set up by Shashanka, a Shaivaite king who ruled approximately between 600 AD and 625 AD. The modern structure of Bengali Hindu society was developed during the rule of the Sena dynasty in the 12th century AD. West Bengal has been home to several famous religious teachers, including Sri Chaitanya, Sri Ramakrishna, Rammohan Roy and Swami Vivekananda.

Culture
The language of the Hindus in West Bengal is Bengali. A large number of Hindu religious texts like biographies of Chaitanya Mahaprabhu, Mangal-kavyas, Bratakathas and Panchalis as well as dharmik writings of modern Bengali philosophers and saints have been produced in Bengali for many centuries.

Religion
Majority of Bengali Hindus follow Shaktism (the Kalikula tradition), minority—Vaishnavism (Gaudiya Vaishnavism, Vaishnava-Sahajiya, Bauls). Shaktas belong to the upper castes as well as lowest castes and tribes, while the lower middle castes are Vaishnavas.

The main devis of the Kalikula tradition are Kali, Chandi, Bheema, Durga, as well as regional goddesses such as Bishahari and Manasa, the snake goddesses, Shashthi, the protectress of children, Shitala, the smallpox goddess, and Umā (the Bengali name for Parvati).

Jagadhatri, Lakshmi and Saraswati), Shiva, Ganesha, Vishwakarma, Krishna, Rama, Jagannath and Vishnu are the other popular and widely worshipped Hindu deities in West Bengal.

Durga Puja is the biggest and most important festival of the Hindus in West Bengal, as well as the most significant festival of the state in general. Kali Puja is the second major festival of the community and it corresponds to the pan-Indian festival of Diwali. Other major festivals include Kojagari Lakshmi Puja, Dolyatra, Jagaddhatri Puja, Rathayatra, Saraswati Puja, Poila Baishakh, Vishwakarma Puja, Gajan, Poush Parban etc.

Festivals

Bengali Hindus in West Bengal observe a number of festivals, hence the Bengali proverb Baro Mase Tero Parbon. Birth Anniversary of Rabindranath Tagore which is celebrated as one of the major festivals of the state, Rathyatra and Janmashtami before the commencement of the autumnal festival season which starts with Vishwakarma Puja on the last day of Bengali month of Bhadra. The annual five-day Durga Puja is the biggest and most widely celebrated Hindu festival in West Bengal. Durga Puja is followed by Kojagari Lakshmi Puja, Kali Puja, Bhai Phonta, Jagaddhatri Puja and Kartik Puja. On 1 January Kalpataru Day is observed as an auspicious day associated with Ramakrishna Paramhansa. The winter solstice is celebrated a Paush Sankranti in mid January, followed by Netaji Jayanti or the birth anniversary of Netaji Subhas Chandra Bose and Saraswati Puja. The spring festival of Holi is celebrated in the form of Dolyatra. The year ends with Charak Puja and Gajan.

Temples

Temple architecture in West Bengal architecture has assumed a unique identity and evolved into the Bengali terra cotta temple architecture which is also a very common style of Hindu temples in Bangladesh. Due to lack of suitable stone in the alluvial Gangetic delta, the temple makers had to resort to other materials instead of stone. This gave rise to using terra cotta as a medium for temple construction. Terra-cotta exteriors with rich carvings are a unique feature of Bengali temples. The town of Vishnupur in West Bengal is renowned for this type of architecture. Usually a part of the intended total motif was carved by hand on one side of a brick and then baked. While under construction, these carved bricks were arranged to make up the entire motif.

The Bengali style of temple is not luxurious. Rather, most are modeled on simple thatched-roof earthen huts used as dwellings by commoners. This can be attributed to the popularity of bhakti sects which taught people to view gods as close to themselves. Thus, various styles like do-chala, jor-bangla, char-chala, and aat-chala sprang up. However, there is also a popular style of building known as Navaratna (nine-towered) or Pancharatna (five-towered) in Bengal which is more luxurious than the Chala buildings. A typical example of Navaratna style is the Dakshineswar Kali Temple. The Shiva temples of rural Bengal has significantly impacted on the architectural style of Kalighat Temple, one of the oldest Hindu temples of India. The famous Birla Temple of Kolkata, built in 1996, has a unique blend of temple architecture of Odisha with Rajasthani temple arts. The Mahakal Temple in Darjeeling is a unique and important Hindu temple since 1782.

Demography

Economy and business

Economic participation, work roles and distribution across professions for Bengali Hindus is similar to the wider population in the rural areas, where agriculture and related activities remain the primary occupation. In the urban areas, the largest segment of the Hindu population is engaged mostly as services professionals across sectors.

Historically, since the advent of Company rule in India, the upper-caste, landed Bengali Hindu gentry increasingly partnered with the East India Company to trade and supply goods such as silk, tea and jute to Europe. Subsequently, these families amassed massive wealth, increased their land holdings (Zamindaris) further. As the ruling elite of Kolkata, they established huge palaces and made the city a magnet for wealth. Businessmen like Dwarkanath Tagore and Raja Nabakrishna Deb are now recognized as some of India's earliest business tycoons in the modern era.

This continued to the 20th century when luminaries like Prafulla Chandra Ray established Bengal Chemicals and Pharmaceuticals, Rajendra Nath Mookerjee formed engineering firm Martin Burn and Surendra Mohan Bose created the Duckback brand during the Swadeshi movement, among many others.

In India, after independence, large number of Bengali Hindus, both from West Bengal have also settled in the rest of India and abroad. The middle and upper middle class populations (who historically had levels of educational attainment) are now well entrenched in numerous professional fields like law, medicine, academics, engineering, journalism, liberal arts, corporates, banking, tax, etc. On the other hand, most of the rural and semi-rural population are now engaged in contractual agriculture, notably in Punjab and Haryana, construction in Kerala and Karnataka, logistics, manufacturing and small-scale businesses across the country.

Average literacy levels of Bengali Hindus remain higher than other communities in West Bengal. However, the opposite is true for the minority Hindu population in Bangladesh.

Noted West Bengali Hindu industrialists include:
Gouri Sen
Gourmohan Dutta of GD Pharmaceuticals-manufacturers 
Hari Ghosh
Banamali Sarkar 
Gobindram Mitter
Prasanna Coomar Tagore
Ramanath Tagore
Rajen Mookerjee 
Rajat Kumar Gupta
Alamohan Das
Purnendu Chatterjee of The Chatterjee Group & Haldia Petrochemicals
Prashant Mukherjee 
Sadhan Dutt
Amar Gopal Bose of Bose Corporation
Aveek Sarkar

See also 
 Hinduism in India
 Religion in West Bengal
 Hinduism in East Bengal
 East Bengali refugees
 Bengali Hindus.

References

Further links

External links 

 

 
Social groups of West Bengal
Ethnic groups in India
Religion in West Bengal